Elizabeth Watson-Brown MP (born 12 October 1956) is an Australian politician and architect who is a member of the Australian Greens, and was elected as the member for the Division of Ryan, Queensland, in the 2022 Australian federal election, defeating Julian Simmonds to win the previously safe Liberal National seat. She is the first woman to represent the Greens in the lower house. She lives in St Lucia and has run her own architectural business in western Brisbane for 21 years.

Watson-Brown's architecture career focused on sustainable design, greening cities, urban resilience, accessibility, and social equity. The first house she designed was the Ngungun House on the Sunshine Coast, which was designed and built in the 1990s. She practiced in Tasmania before moving back to Queensland and designing her first house. She helped design the highly controversial 443 Queen Street development in Brisbane. The residential tower, which has been described as "sub-tropical", was the first residential building in Australia to be given a 6 Star Green Star rating by the Green Building Council of Australia. Watson-Brown is an adjunct professor of architecture at the University of Queensland, a life fellow of the Australian Institute of Architects, has been Queensland State Awards director and National Awards juror, and has held many other design advisory and jury roles.

Electoral history

References

1956 births
Living people
Australian Greens members of the Parliament of Australia
Members of the Australian House of Representatives
Members of the Australian House of Representatives for Ryan
Women members of the Australian House of Representatives
People from Brisbane
University of Queensland alumni
Australian women architects
21st-century Australian politicians
21st-century Australian women politicians